Guy Sion (born 1980 in Israel) is an Israeli jazz saxophonist, residing in Oslo, Norway.

Biography 
Sion moved to Oslo, Norway, in late 2010 and started working as a music teacher in the Oslo area. He performed at the 2011 Moldejazz with his Lennie Tristano tribute band Crosscurrent. In January 2012 Sion released his second album Away featuring Norwegian the guitarist Bjørn Vidar Solli and pianist Erlend Slettevoll. Away was well reviews by All About Jazz as well as in the Norwegian media NRK P2 Kulturnytt, Aftenposten, and Dagsavisen.

Since 2013 he has been playing the 1st Alto saxophone in the Norwegian big bands Primetime Orchestra and Ett Fett Storeband, and is the co-leader of The Diaspora House, a band playing Jewish music from around the world (Ashkenazi, Sephardic Mizrahi) in a Jazz setting.

Discography 
2010: Half The Battle (Self Produced), with Sam Barsh, Gavin Fallow, Colin Stranahan
2012: Away (Self Produced), with Bjørn Vidar Solli, Erlend Slettevoll, Phil Donkin, Jon Wikan

References

External links 

Saxophones by Guy Sion at YouTube

1980 births
Living people
Israeli Jews
Israeli jazz saxophonists
Berklee College of Music alumni
Conservatorium van Amsterdam alumni
Israeli expatriates in the United States
Israeli expatriates in Norway
21st-century saxophonists